Magellan Bay is a body of water on the northeastern side of Mactan Island near Lapu-Lapu City.

Bays of the Philippines
Landforms of Cebu